The Belknap Stone House in Newburgh, New York, was built by Abel Belknap in the 1750s.

Abel Belknap chaired the local Committee of Safety during the war, and when the Continental Army was encamped in the Newburgh area in 1782–83, the house served as James Clinton's headquarters in the area. Today it has been restored and operates as Stone Cottage Veterinary Clinic. It was added to the National Register of Historic Places in 2001.

References

 http://landmarkhunter.com/143876-belknap-stone-house/

Houses on the National Register of Historic Places in New York (state)
Houses in Orange County, New York
National Register of Historic Places in Orange County, New York
American Revolutionary War sites
Buildings and structures in Newburgh, New York
Federal architecture in New York (state)